Stereocaulon subcoralloides is a species of snow lichen belonging to the family Stereocaulaceae.

Ecology
Stereocaulon subcoralloides is a known host to the lichenicolous fungus species:

 Catillaria stereocaulorum
 Cercidospora stereocaulorum
 Diploschistes muscorum
 Opegrapha stereocaulicola

References

Lichen species
Lichens described in 1878
Stereocaulaceae
Taxa named by William Nylander (botanist)